Charles (6 March 18236 October 1891) was King of Württemberg, from 25 June 1864 until his death in 1891.

Early life
Charles was born on 6 March 1823 in Stuttgart as the son of King William I and his third wife Pauline Therese (1800–1873). As the king's eldest son he became Crown Prince of Württemberg.
He studied in Berlin and Tübingen.

Marriage and King of Württemberg
On 13 July 1846 Charles married Grand Duchess Olga Nikolaievna of Russia, the daughter of Emperor Nicholas I of Russia and Charlotte of Prussia. (Charlotte was a daughter of Frederick William III of Prussia and of Louise of Mecklenburg-Strelitz; she took the name Alexandra Feodorovna upon her marriage into the Russian imperial family.) Charles acceded to the throne of Württemberg upon his father's death in 1864.

The couple had no children, perhaps because of Charles' homosexuality. Charles I became the object of scandal several times for his closeness with various men - most notoriously with  the American Charles Woodcock, a former chamberlain whom Charles I elevated to Baron Savage in 1888.
Charles I and Charles Woodcock became inseparable, going so far as to appear together in public dressed identically.  The resulting outcry forced the king to renounce his favorite.  Woodcock returned to America, and Charles I found private consolation some years later with the technical director of the royal theater, Wilhelm George.

In 1870, Olga and Charles I adopted Olga's niece Vera Konstantinovna, the daughter of her brother Grand Duke Konstantin.

Politics
He sided with Austria in the Austro-Prussian War of 1866, but after the battle of Sadowa concluded a secret military treaty with Prussia, and took part on her side in the Franco-Prussian War of 1870–71, joining the new German Empire at the close of 1870.

He died, childless, in Stuttgart on 6 October 1891, and was succeeded as King of Württemberg by his sister's son, William II.
He is buried, together with his wife, in the Old Castle in Stuttgart.

Honours

Arms

Bibliography 

For Karl's homosexuality and other familiar issues:
 Queen Olga of Württemberg. Traum der Jugend goldener Stern, Reutlingen, Günther Neske, 1955
 Jette Sachs-Colignon. Königin Olga von Württemberg, Stieglitz, 2002
 Paul Sauer. Regent mit mildem Zepter. König Karl von Württemberg, Deutsche Verlags-Anstalt Stuttgart, 1999

References

External links

1823 births
1891 deaths
19th-century German LGBT people
19th-century kings of Württemberg
Extra Knights Companion of the Garter
Grand Croix of the Légion d'honneur
Grand Crosses of the Order of Saint Stephen of Hungary
Knights of the Golden Fleece of Spain
Grand Crosses of the Order of Saint-Charles
Kings of Württemberg
LGBT heads of state
LGBT royalty
German landowners
Lieutenant generals of Württemberg
Lieutenant generals of Prussia
Members of the Württembergian Chamber of Lords
Nobility from Stuttgart
Protestant monarchs